= General Health Insurance Company =

Slovak health insurance company

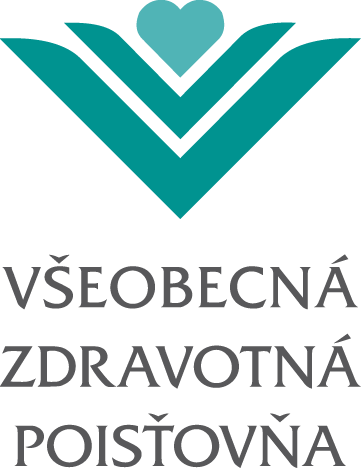
- Native name: Všeobecná zdravotná poisťovňa
- Type: State-owned company
- Industry: Health insurance
- Founded: 1995; 31 years ago, transformed into a company in 2005
- Headquarters: Panónska cesta 2, 851 04 Petržalka, Slovakia
- Area served: Slovakia
- Key people: Richard Strapko (Chairman); Beata Havelková (Director); Ľubomír Kováčik (Director); Martin Smatana (Director); Marcel Klimek (Director); Tomáš Malatinský (Director); Oskar Dvořák (Director); Katarína Berová (Director); Juraj Pache (Director)
- Website: www.vszp.sk

The General Health Insurance Company (Slovak: Všeobecná zdravotná poisťovňa), is a Slovak health insurance company. It has branches in most districts and is the largest health insurance provider in the country. As of 2018, it insured approximately 62% of the population of Slovakia.

It was established in 1995 from the National Insurance Company. On 1 July 2005, it was transformed into a joint-stock company with 100% state participation administered by the Ministry of Health. As of 1 January 2010, it was merged with the Joint Health Insurance Company.

== History ==
The General Health Insurance Company (VSZP) was established in Slovakia on 1 July 1998 by merging the three previous health insurance companies: The Railway Health Insurance Company (Železničná zdravotná poisťovňa), Insurance Company of the Ministry of the Interior of the Slovak Republic (Poisťovňa Ministerstva vnútra SR), and the Military Health Insurance Company (Vojenská zdravotná poisťovňa).

The spokesperson of the company was Martina Ostatníková, a well known singer.

On 31 December 2009 the company merged with the Joint Health Insurance Company.
